John Bothwell of Auldhamer, Lord Holyroodhouse (c.1550–1609) was a 16th-century Scottish judge and Senator of the College of Justice residing at Holyrood House prior to it becoming a royal palace.

Life
He was born in Bothwell House in Edinburgh, the son of Bishop Adam Bothwell, a Lord of Session and bishop of Orkney. His mother was Margaret Murray, daughter of John Murray of Touchadam. His paternal uncle Richard Bothwell served as Provost of Edinburgh during the reign of Mary Queen of Scots. His grandfather Francis Bothwell had also been a Senator of the College of Justice since its foundation in 1532 and a Lord of Session in the Edinburgh courts. Francis was Provost of Edinburgh 1523/24. His aunt, Janet Bothwell, was mother of the mathematician, John Napier.

In early life he was styled "John Bothwell of Alhammer".

Being a favourite of King James VI he was made Abbot or Commendator of Holyrood Abbey from 1581.

In July 1593 he was created a Senator of the College of Justice and Lord of Session, in place of his father, and adopted the title of "Lord Holyroodhouse".

He dressed as an Amazon in August 1594 to perform in the tournament at the baptism of Prince Henry at Stirling Castle. In May 1595 James VI gave him a diamond ring worth £180 Scots. In September 1595 James VI sent him to be his representative at the christening of a child of Elizabeth Douglas, Countess of Erroll.

He was an ally of the Laird of Buccleuch.

His correspondence with Anthony Bacon in England in 1596 mentions his relation, Mr Kello, the husband of the calligrapher Esther Inglis.

In December 1607 the king elevated the title from a non-hereditary legal title to a hereditary title.

He died on 26 November 1609. He is thought to be buried in Holyrood Abbey adjacent to his home. If so he logically shares the grave of his parents at the second column from the main east window.

Family

He was married to Maria or Marie Carmichael (died 1626), a daughter of Sir John Carmichael of Carmichael (d.1600).

She lived in Advocate's Close in Edinburgh, on the site of the present later house called "Adam Bothwell's house", built by William Dick of Braid. Her will mentions a larger "meikle" hall with a "wainscot" or oak dining table, a cupboard (shelves) made of "fir" or pine on an oak table.

Their son John Bothwell became the 2nd Lord Holyroodhouse. He seemed to have lived in Dundee rather than Edinburgh as he became a burgess of that town in 1620. The title Lord Holyroodhouse temporarily expired with his death in 1638 but was readopted in the early 18th century by his descendant Henry Bothwell, 3rd Lord Holyroodhouse (1657-1755).

References

1609 deaths
Peers of Scotland created by James VI
Senators of the College of Justice
Year of birth uncertain